Michael Dellorusso (born August 22, 1983 in White Plains, New York) is an American former professional soccer player.

Career

College
Dellorusso grew up in Columbia, Maryland, attended Wilde Lake High School, and played college soccer at the University of Maryland, College Park from 2001–05.  He appeared in 93 games over four seasons, scoring 2 goals and assisting on 20.  He was named team captain his junior and senior seasons.

During his college years he also played in the USL Premier Development League for Chesapeake Dragons.

Professional
Dellorusso was drafted in the fourth round, 42nd overall, of the 2006 MLS SuperDraft by FC Dallas. He spent part of his first season on loan with Minnesota Thunder of the USL First Division.  In 2007, his second year with the team, Dellorusso made his first career MLS start on October 20, 2007 against the Kansas City Wizards in a 2–0 loss.  He played the entire 90 minutes of the game at the right back position and would be his only MLS start of the 2007 season.  During the 2008 MLS season, Dellorusso was promoted to the senior roster on May 7, 2007 replacing retired defender Alex Yi.  He made eight regular season appearances with FC Dallas, starting one game on September 4, 2008 against the Colorado Rapids in a 1–0 loss.

Dellorusso was released by Dallas on July 23, 2009, and subsequently signed for Austin Aztex. He made 7 league appearances for the Aztex before being released at the end of the season.

In November 2009 Dellorusso signed to play professional indoor soccer for Baltimore Blast in the Major Indoor Soccer League during the 2009/10 USL-1 offseason.

Coaching
Dellorusso was an assistant coach for the University of Maryland men's soccer team from 2010–2013. He was named head coach of Arizona United SC on March 28, 2014. His record was 20 wins, 29 losses and 7 ties in two seasons. On September 25, 2015, United declined to renew his contract.

References

External links
 MLS player profile
 Baltimore Blast bio
 Maryland bio

1983 births
Living people
American soccer players
American people of Italian descent
Association football defenders
Austin Aztex FC players
Chesapeake Dragons players
FC Dallas draft picks
FC Dallas players
Houston Dynamo FC non-playing staff
Major League Soccer players
Maryland Terrapins men's soccer players
Minnesota Thunder players
People from Columbia, Maryland
People from White Plains, New York
Phoenix Rising FC coaches
Soccer players from Maryland
Sportspeople from the Baltimore metropolitan area
Sportspeople from Westchester County, New York
USL First Division players
USL League Two players
American soccer coaches